Hollington Drive is a four part ITV television drama series that began broadcasting on 29 September 2021. Created and written by Sophie Petzal, the series follows two sisters and their families as they grapple with the potential crime of their children.

Synopsis
Two sisters, café chain owner Theresa (Anna Maxwell Martin) and primary school headteacher Helen (Rachael Stirling), are inseparable, living side-by-side with their families in well-to-do suburban Hollington Drive. One summer evening, after their children go out to play, a local boy, Alex, goes missing. The mystery tears the families apart and tests the sisters' bond to the limit.

Cast
 Anna Maxwell Martin as Theresa Wescott
 Rachael Stirling as Helen Bardwell, her sister
 Peter McDonald as David Bardwell, Helen's husband
 Rhashan Stone as Fraser, Theresa's partner
 Jonas Armstrong as Gareth Boyd, Alex's father
 Jodie McNee as Jean Boyd, Alex's mother
 Ken Nwosu as Eddie, Fraser's brother
 Jim Howick as Detective Sergeant Robin Parks
 Amelie Bea Smith as Eva Bardwell, Helen and David's daughter
 Fraser Holmes as Ben Wescott, Theresa's son
 Tia May Watts as Georgina, Fraser's daughter

Episode list

Production
The fictitious upmarket 'Hollington Drive' where most of the filming was done is on Ardwyn Walk in Dinas Powys in Southern Wales. Other filming locations are the Hang Fire Southern Kitchen restaurant in Barry (Wales) and Sanatorium Park (Cardiff).

Reception
Lucy Mangan of The Guardian gave the first episode three out of five stars, praising the leads and potential. Ed Cumming of The Independent gave the first episode three out of five stars, questioning some of the tropes, but writing of Martin, "[she] is incapable of playing a scene without emotional intelligence, and brilliantly conveys a woman whose mind is racing to nightmarish conclusions while she maintains an appearance of calm", and Stirling, "a worthy foil to her, all patrician vowels and buttoned-up denial, in pronounced contrast to Theresa’s doom". The Telegraph gave it four out of five stars, dubbing it, "layered and intriguing".

References

External links
 

2021 British television series debuts
2021 British television series endings
2020s British drama television series
2020s British television miniseries
British thriller television series
English-language television shows
Television shows set in England
Television series by All3Media